Ugo Bologna (11 September 1917 – 29 January 1998) was an Italian actor and voice actor.

Biography
Born in Milan, the son of a municipal employee and a housewife, in 1936 Bologna started working as a primary school teacher, and in 1939 he attended the course for cadet officers in the former italian city of Pula. A lieutenant during World War II, he was wounded  during a battle, and then received a bronze medal for military valor.

In 1950 he decided to give up his teaching profession and devote himself to acting.  After enrolling an acting course under Isabella Riva he made his stage debut with the Fantasio Piccoli's company.  Even if mostly cast in character roles, Bologna was one of the most active actors in Italian cinema in 1970s and 1980s, usually in comedic roles.

Active as a voice actor, in 1970 Bologna founded in Milan the dubbing company "CDM" (Cooperativa Doppiatori Milanesi).

Death
Bologna died of a heart attack on 29 January 1998 at the age of 80.

Selected filmography

Raintree County (1957) - Acciari
Esploratori a cavallo (1961)
Bandits in Milan (1968) - Police Official (uncredited)
A Herdeira Rebelde (1972)
Gang War in Milan (1973) - Judge
The Five Days (1973) -  Official at victory celebratiom
L'albero dalle foglie rosa (1974)
Killer Cop (1975) - Mancuso, Policeman
Manhunt in the City (1975) - Policeman (uncredited)
Faccia di spia (1975) - Salvador Allende
Un prete scomodo (1975)
Di che segno sei? (1975) - Commendatore Bravetta
Una sera c'incontrammo (1975) - Galbusera
Amori, letti e tradimenti (1975) - Commendator Guido Mordacchia
Il secondo tragico Fantozzi (1976) - Ispettor degli Ispettori, Corrado Maria Lobbiam
The Con Artists (1976) - Prison Warden
Sangue di sbirro (1976) - Mallory
Passi furtivi in una notte boia (1976) - Doctor
Movie Rush - La febbre del cinema (1976) - Producer
The Virgo, the Taurus and the Capricorn (1977) - Comm.Ferretti, Gianni's father (uncredited)
Un cuore semplice (1977)
La Bidonata (1977) - Attorney
Three Tigers Against Three Tigers (1977) - Sindaco Bossetti
Ecco noi per esempio (1977) - Commesso nel negozio di dischi
Il... Belpaese (1977) - Direttore della banca
La presidentessa (1977) - Notary Piovano
State Reasons (1978)
Io tigro, tu tigri, egli tigra (1978)
Piccole labbra (1978) - Franz
Pugni, dollari e spinaci (1978)
From Corleone to Brooklyn (1979) - Hitman (uncredited)
Zombie 2 (1979) - Anne's Father (uncredited)
Arrivano i gatti (1980) - Commendator Mario Bonivento
Il viziaccio (1980)
The Precarious Bank Teller (1980) - Morpurgo - un direttore di banca
Ombre (1980)
I Made a Splash (1980) - Cliente
Nightmare City (1980) - Mr. Desmond
Catherine and I (1980) - Passenger on airplane
La tua vita per mio figlio (1980) - Sante Asciolla
Spaghetti a mezzanotte (1981) - Don Vito
Quando la coppia scoppia (1981) - Alfredo - Enrico's father
The Mafia Triangle (1981) - TV manager
Il falco e la colomba (1981)
Fracchia la belva umana (1981) - Direttore della banca
Cicciabomba (1982) - Mayor
Journey with Papa (1982) - Ing. Mantovani
Time for Loving (1983) - Commendator Carraro
Sing Sing (1983) - The Producer
Occhio, malocchio, prezzemolo e finocchio (1983) - Comm. Raggiotti
Sapore di mare 2 - Un anno dopo (1983) - Commendator Carraro
Il tassinaro (1983) - Milanese Builder
Fantozzi subisce ancora (1983) - Corrado Maria Lobbiam, Ispettor degli Ispettori
Wild beasts - Belve feroci (1984) - Inspector Nat Braun
Yuppies (1986) - Suocero di Lorenzo
Grandi magazzini (1986) - Dott. Tucci
I Won the New Year's Lottery (1989)
The Heroes (1994) - Calabrò (final film role)

References

External links
 

1917 births
1998 deaths
Male actors from Milan
Italian male film actors
20th-century Italian male actors
Italian male television actors
Italian male voice actors
Italian male stage actors
Italian military personnel of World War II